Ambulyx belli is a species of moth in the family Sphingidae. It was described by Karl Jordan in 1923, and is known from India. It is named after the Indian forest officer and naturalist Thomas Reid Davys Bell.

References

Ambulyx
Moths described in 1923
Moths of Asia